Benjamin Cross was a composer.

Ben(jamin) Cross may also refer to:

Benny Cross (1898–1986), footballer
Ben Cross (1947–2020), Harold Abrahams actor in 1981 film Chariots of Fire
Ben Cross (rugby league) (born 1978), Australian rugby league footballer